Hilaalee dynasty was one of the earlier Muslim (later christian) ruling-dynasties of the history of the Maldives. It ruled the country from 1388 to 1573. It came under Portuguese power in 1558 and disestablished in 1573 after the Utheemu rebellion against the Portuguese presence. After the disestablishment, an interregnum period started in the history of the Maldives.

History 
The first king of the Maldivian Hilaalee dynasty was Hassan I of the Maldives and he was proclaimed king in the year 1388 AD.

Hilaalee dynasty in the oldest records were presumably from Somali descendants.

Some historical documents reveal that Hilali Kalo Hassan dethroned King Uthman Rasgefaan, who was the ruling King at that time and outcast him and all his ministers. After this Hilai Kalo Hassan started the Hilai Dynasty.

See also
List of Sultans of the Maldives
List of Sunni Muslim dynasties

References

Maldivian dynasties